Eduardo Álvarez (born 28 August 1950) is a Venezuelan former tennis player.

Álvarez, who was born in Caracas, made his only appearance for the Venezuela Davis Cup team in a 1966 American Zone quarter-final tie against the Caribbean/West Indies. He was called upon in the doubles and teamed up with Isaías Pimentel to beat the Jamaican pairing of Lance Lumsden and Richard Russell in five sets.

At the 1966 Central American and Caribbean Games in San Juan, Álvarez won a bronze medal for Venezuela in the mixed doubles event, partnering Beatriz Raytler.

References

External links
 
 

1950 births
Living people
Venezuelan male tennis players
Competitors at the 1966 Central American and Caribbean Games
Central American and Caribbean Games medalists in tennis
Central American and Caribbean Games bronze medalists for Venezuela
Tennis players from Caracas
20th-century Venezuelan people
21st-century Venezuelan people